William Loney (31 May 1879 – 6 March 1956) was a Scottish footballer who played for Celtic, Partick Thistle, Motherwell and Scotland. He had a key role in the Celtic team of the 1900s which won six consecutive Scottish Football League championships.

His brother James (Clyde, Dundee Hibernian) and cousin Harry (Falkirk, Alloa Athletic, Dumbarton) were also footballers.

Honours
Celtic
Scottish Division One: 1904–05, 1905–06, 1906–07, 1907–08, 1908–09, 1909–10
Scottish Cup: 1903–04, 1907–08, 1911–12
Glasgow Cup: 1904–05, 1905–06, 1907–08, 1909–10

References

Sources

External links

1879 births
1956 deaths
People from Denny, Falkirk
Footballers from Falkirk (council area)
Association football central defenders
Scottish footballers
Scotland international footballers
Belfast Celtic F.C. players
Celtic F.C. players
Partick Thistle F.C. players
Motherwell F.C. players
Clydebank F.C. (1914) players
Scottish Football League players
Scottish Football League representative players